Assumption is a small unincorporated community and also a historically Irish (Catholic) community in southern Amboy Township, Fulton County, Ohio, United States. A part of the Toledo Metropolitan Area, it lies seven miles from the northern edge of Swanton. It is located at roughly 41°40'N, 83°55'W.

History
Assumption was originally named St. Mary's Corners because it was the location of St. Mary's Catholic Church. In 1840, the area was called both Caraghar's Corners and Caraghar, after an early Irish settler of the area named Patrick Caraghar. Along with Caraghar came the Savage family originated (likely) from County Down, Northern Ireland (U.K.). Hugh Savage and his wife Bridget Savage helped establish St. Mary's Catholic Church or present day (Holy Trinity Catholic Church). Their names can be found both in inside the Church and across the street in the local commentary. By 1942, the village assumed its current name.

References

Unincorporated communities in Fulton County, Ohio
Unincorporated communities in Ohio